The Tabo Pagoda of the Pohyonsa Buddhist temple located at Mt. Myohyang, Hyangam-ri, Hyangsan County, North Phyongan Province, is listed as a National Treasure of North Korea. A one-third model of the Pagoda is on display at the Korean Central History Museum.

Details
Also known as the "Pagoda of many treasures", this structure is a two-storey pagoda. The first storey consists of a platform with four stone staircases leading up to the elevated portion. Here, four pillars create a sheltered area that is thought to once have held a Buddhist statue. The second central stage is made of a simple cornice with rounded, beam-like blocks of granite.

The pagoda is the feminine counterpart to the masculine Sokka Pagoda of the Pulguska Temple; it inspired the design of the French Embassy in Seoul by Korean architect Kim Chung-up.

References 

Korean pagodas
Stone pagodas
National Treasures of North Korea
Pagodas in North Korea
Buildings and structures in North Pyongan Province